McGehee House may refer to:

United States

McGehee-Stringfellow House, Greensboro, Alabama, listed on the National Register of Historic Places in Hale County, Alabama
McGehee-Woodall House, Columbus, Georgia, listed on the National Register of Historic Places in Muscogee County, Georgia
McGehee House (Hammond, Louisiana), listed on the National Register of Historic Places in Tangipahoa Parish, Louisiana
McGehee House (Liberty, Mississippi), listed on the National Register of Historic Places in Amite County, Mississippi
McGeehee-Ames House, Macon, Mississippi, listed on the National Register of Historic Places in Noxubee County, Mississippi
McGehee Plantation, Senatobia, Mississippi, listed on the National Register of Historic Places in Tate County, Mississippi
Theodore L. McGehee Plantation House, Summit, Mississippi, listed on the National Register of Historic Places in Amite County, Mississippi
McGehee House (Vicksburg, Mississippi), listed on the National Register of Historic Places in Warren County, Mississippi

See also
McGee House (disambiguation)
McGhee House (disambiguation)